The Ireland national hurling team, consisting solely of hurlers, is a representative team for Ireland (both Northern Ireland and the Republic of Ireland) in the sport of composite rules shinty–hurling.

The team is usually made up of a mixture of high-profile hurlers who compete in the All-Ireland Senior Hurling Championship as well as lesser-known players who play for smaller counties which traditionally compete in the Christy Ring and Nicky Rackard Cups.

At present the only team it plays is the Scotland national shinty team, on an annual basis in the Shinty–Hurling International Series. Ireland have won 7 of 12 series played at men's senior level. The current managers of the senior men's team are Jeffrey Lynskey and Gregory O'Kane, who took over the role from Michael Walshe at the end of 2014. A former captain of the team was Tommy Walsh.

Danny Cullen captained the team in 2019.

A women's side and men's under 21 side also compete against Scottish opponents in separate series each year.

See also
 Scotland national shinty team
 Shinty–Hurling International Series
 Ireland international rules football team

References

Hurling in Ireland
hurling